Bouin may refer to:

Places in France
 Bouin, Deux-Sèvres, in the Deux-Sèvres department
 Bouin, Vendée, in the Vendée department
 Isle of Bouin, a former island in the Vendée department
 Bouin-Plumoison, in the Pas-de-Calais department
 Neuvy-Bouin, in the Deux-Sèvres department
 Villiers-au-Bouin, in the Indre-et-Loire department

Other uses
 Bouin solution, a type of fixative used in histology
 Jean Bouin (1888–1914), French Olympic runner
 Sébastien Bouin, French rock climber
 Stade Jean-Bouin (disambiguation)

See also
 Buin (disambiguation)